The 2020 Open du Pays d'Aix was a professional tennis tournament played on clay courts. It was the seventh edition of the tournament which was part of the 2020 ATP Challenger Tour. It took place in Aix-en-Provence, France between 7 and 13 September 2020.

Singles main-draw entrants

Seeds

 1 Rankings as of 31 August 2020.

Other entrants
The following players received wildcards into the singles main draw:
  Quentin Halys
  Harold Mayot
  Gilles Simon

The following player received entry into the singles main draw using a protected ranking:
  Dustin Brown

The following players received entry into the singles main draw as special exempts:
  Daniel Altmaier
  Oscar Otte

The following players received entry from the qualifying draw:
  Roberto Cid Subervi
  Hugo Gaston
  Renzo Olivo
  Elias Ymer

The following players received entry as lucky losers:
  Ruben Bemelmans
  Arthur Cazaux

Champions

Singles

 Oscar Otte def.  Thiago Seyboth Wild 6–2, 6–7(4–7), 6–4.

Doubles

 Andrés Molteni /  Hugo Nys def.  Ariel Behar /  Gonzalo Escobar 6–4, 7–6(7–4).

References

External links
Official Website

2020 ATP Challenger Tour
2020
2020 in French tennis
September 2020 sports events in France